DU Lyncis is a single variable star in the constellation Lynx. It is a faint star but visible to the naked eye with an apparent visual magnitude of 5.15. The star is moving closer with a heliocentric radial velocity of −37 km/s.

This is an aging red giant star with a stellar classification of M3 III, indicating that it has consumed the hydrogen at its core and evolved away from the main sequence. Eggen lists it as being on the asymptotic giant branch. It has been classified as a semiregular variable of type SRb, ranging from magnitude 5.18 down to 5.31 with periods of 360 and possibly 22 days. It shines with a luminosity approximately 536 times that of the Sun and has an effective temperature of 3,779 K.

References

M-type giants
Semiregular variable stars
Lynx (constellation)
Durchmusterung objects
062647
037946
2999
Lynis, DU